Wayrakancha (Quechua wayra wind, kancha enclosure, enclosed place, yard, a frame, or wall that encloses, Hispanicized spelling Huayracancha) is a mountain in the Cordillera Central in the Andes of Peru, about  high. It is situated in the Junín Region, Yauli Province, Yauli District, and in the Lima Region, Huarochiri Province, Chicla District. Wayrakancha lies northwest of Pumaqucha.

See also 
 Putka

References

Mountains of Peru
Mountains of Lima Region
Mountains of Junín Region